The SBS Drama Awards, also known as SBS Awards Festival, is an awards ceremony presented annually by Seoul Broadcasting System (SBS) for outstanding achievements in Korean dramas aired on its network. It is held annually on December 31. The highest honor of the ceremony is the "Grand Prize", awarded to the best actor or actress of the year.

Grand Prize (Daesang)

SBS Special Award

Top Excellence in Acting Awards

Best Actor

Best Actress

Best Actor in a Miniseries

Best Actress in a Miniseries

Best Actor in a Mid-Length Drama

Best Actress in a Mid-Length Drama

Best Actor in a Special Planning Drama

Best Actress in a Special Planning Drama

Best Actor in a Serial Drama

Best Actress in a Serial Drama

Best Actor in a Genre & Fantasy Drama

Best Actress in a Genre & Fantasy Drama

Best Actor in a Romantic-Comedy Drama

Best Actress in a Romantic-Comedy Drama

Best Actor in a Monday–Tuesday Drama

Best Actress in a Monday–Tuesday Drama

Best Actor in a Wednesday–Thursday Drama

Best Actress in a Wednesday–Thursday Drama

Best Actor in a Daily/Weekend Drama

Best Actress in a Daily/Weekend Drama

Best Actor in a Miniseries Fantasy/Romance Drama

Best Actress in a Miniseries Fantasy/Romance Drama

Best Actor in a Miniseries Genre/Action Drama

Best Actress in a Miniseries Genre/Action Drama

Best Actor in a Miniseries Genre/Fantasy Drama

Best Actor in a Miniseries Fantasy Drama

Best Actress in a Miniseries Genre/Fantasy Drama

Best Actor in a Miniseries Romance/Comedy Drama

Best Actress in a Miniseries Romance/Comedy Drama

Excellence in Acting Awards

Best Actor

Best Actress

Best Actor in a Miniseries

Best Actress in a Miniseries

Best Actor in a Mid-Length Drama

Best Actress in a Drama Special

Best Actor in a Special Planning Drama

Best Actress in a Special Planning Drama

Best Actor in a Serial Drama

Best Actress in a Serial Drama

Best Actor in a Drama Short

Best Actress in a Drama Short

Best Actor in a Fantasy Drama

Best Actress in a Fantasy Drama

Best Actor in a Genre Drama

Best Actress in a Genre Drama

Best Actor in a Romantic-Comedy Drama

Best Actress in a Romantic-Comedy Drama

Best Actor in a Monday–Tuesday Drama

Best Actress in a Monday–Tuesday Drama

Best Actor in a Wednesday–Thursday Drama

Best Actress in a Wednesday–Thursday Drama

Best Actor in a Daily/Weekend Drama

Best Actress in a Daily/Weekend Drama

Best Actor in a Miniseries Fantasy/Romance Drama

Best Actor in a  Miniseries Genre/Action Drama

Best Actress in  Miniseries Fantasy/Romance Drama

Best Actress in Miniseries Genre/Action Drama

Best Actor in a Mini-Series Genre/Fantasy Drama

Best Actress in a Mini-Series Genre/Fantasy Drama

Best Actor in a Mini-Series Romance/Comedy Drama

Best Actress in a Mini-Series Romance/Comedy Drama

Supporting Awards

Best Supporting Actor

Best Supporting Actress

Special Acting Awards

Actor

Actress

Producer's Award

Top 10 Stars

Big Star Award

Newcomer Awards

Best New Actor

Best New Actress

New Star Award

Youth Awards

Best Young Actor

Best Young Actress

Popularity Awards

Netizen Popularity Award

SBSi Award

Best Couple Award

Sitcom

Variety

Radio

Friendship Award

Other Awards

Achievement Award

Hosts

Records
Most Daesang wins:
Park Shin-yang (2) – Lovers in Paris (2004), War of Money (2007)
Han Suk-kyu (2) – Deep Rooted Tree (2011), Romantic Doctor, Teacher Kim (2016)
Kim Nam-gil (2) – The Fiery Priest (2019), Through the Darkness (2022)  
Youngest Daesang winner: Moon Geun-young (Age: 21) – Painter of the Wind (2008)

See also

 List of Asian television awards
 KBS Drama Awards
 MBC Drama Awards

References 

 
South Korean television awards
Awards established in 1993
Annual events in South Korea
South Korea annual television specials